Justinas Marcinkevičius (10 March 1930 – 16 February 2011) was a prominent Lithuanian poet and playwright.

Life and career

Marcinkevičius was born in 1930 in Važatkiemis, Prienai District. In 1954, he graduated from the Faculty of History and Philology of Vilnius University with a degree in Lithuanian language and literature. He joined the Communist Party of Lithuania in 1957. He worked for a number of years as vice-chairman of the board of the Union of Lithuanian Writers.  Marcinkevičius is regarded as one of the most prominent members of Sąjūdis. He died in Vilnius.

Literary style and themes

Having grown up during the post-war period, Marcinkevičius evokes in his poetry a romanticized version of childhood spent in the Lithuanian countryside, of first love, of man's relationship with nature.  In his poetry specific and solid peasant thinking is combined with a mind seeking to draw broad general conclusions, and the tradition of Lithuanian poetry singing the Earth's praises with contemporary modes of poetic thought. As a poet, he has sought to grasp the essence of national experience and give it fresh artistic expression. In his lyrical verse Marcinkevičius strives to comprehend the real meaning of what is going on inside man and society and moves the reader with his ardent lyrical confessions.

For most his life Justinas Marcinkevičius lived and wrote during the complex times of Soviet totalitarianism. He defended the cultural self-awareness of his nation. The poet brought back humanistic idea in describing a man, continued on the romantic and lyric poetry tradition, valued the aesthetic side of literature, as opposed to the heroic and propagandistic style of socialist realism. Marcinkevičius wrote poems in a romantic and modern style.

Awards and acknowledgements
 Lithuanian National Prize
 Herder Prize 1998
 Baltic Assembly Prize for Literature, the Arts and Science (2001)
 National Advancement Prize in Culture (18 May 2008)

Works of note 

After the emergence of Marcinkevičius' first book I Plead for a Word in 1955, he has published fourteen collections of poetry, three historical plays, two collections of essays, a novella and various translations into Lithuanian.

Poetry and compilations
Liepsnojantis krūmas (The Burning Bush; 1968)
Gyvenimo švelnus prisiglaudimas (The Gentle Cuddle of Life; 1978)
Rhymed trilogy of historical dramas:
Mindaugas (1968, English translation of Part 2 in 1971)
Mažvydas (1977)
Katedra (The Cathedral; 1971)

Novels
Dienoraštis be datų (A Diary Without Dates; 1981)
Tekančios upės vienybė (Unity of a Flowing River; 1994)

He has also translated into Lithuanian works of Adam Mickiewicz, Alexandr Pushkin, Sergei Yesenin, Mikhail Lermontov, and the Finnish Kalevala legend.

References
 Year of Lithuanian book. Justinas Marcinkevičius Biography. Retrieved on 2007-09-24
"HONOR AND SUFFERING,The Second Part of the Drama-Poem MINDAUGAS," Lituanus 17,4 (1971)  . Retrieved on 2013-03-15
"Mindaugas," translated by Ona Čerškutė-Spidell, introduced by Rimvydas Šilbajoris, in Alfreds Straumanis, ed., Fire and Night: Five Baltic Plays (Prospect Heights, IL: Waveland Press, 1986), pages 145-208.

1930 births
2011 deaths
Burials at Antakalnis Cemetery
Lithuanian male poets
Lithuanian dramatists and playwrights
Recipients of the Lithuanian National Prize
Vilnius University alumni
People from Prienai District Municipality

Grand Crosses of the Order of Vytautas the Great
20th-century poets
20th-century dramatists and playwrights
Herder Prize recipients
Recipients of the Order of the White Star, 2nd Class